Sacajawea Peak is a peak in the Wallowa Mountains, in the U.S. state of Oregon. It is in the Eagle Cap Wilderness and the Wallowa–Whitman National Forest.

Description
At , Sacajawea Peak is the highest point in the Wallowa Mountains, and the 6th highest peak in Oregon. Matterhorn, another peak in the Wallowa Mountains, is about the same height at Sacajawea Peak, and some sources claim it is actually slightly higher.

It is ranked 18th among peaks in the 48 contiguous states. It is the 2nd most prominent peak in Oregon, after Mount Hood. 

The nearest peak higher than Sacajawea is Pinyon Peak, in the Rocky Mountains of Idaho,  to the east. This makes Sacajawea Peak the 25th most topographically isolated peak of the United States.

Sacajawea Peak is the highest summit in the Eagle Cap Wilderness and the Wallowa–Whitman National Forest.

Sacajawea Peak is connected by high ridges to Matterhorn. Both are connected to Hurwal Divide, a high ridge extending east and north from Sacajawea and Matterhorn. A high pass connects Hurwal Divide to Chief Joseph Mountain, to the north. These mountains and high ridges form a unit separated from the rest of the Wallowas by river valleys, with the West Fork Wallowa River flows north along the east edge and Hurricane Creek along the west. Numerous tributaries flow from the high mountains to these rivers. Sacajawea Peak is closer to Hurricane Creek, and several tributary streams rise on the slopes of Sacajawea, such as Thorp Creek. To the west of Sacajawea Peak, across the valley of Hurricane Creek, is the high ridge of Hurricane Divide, which separates Hurricane Creek from Lostine River. South of the Sacajawea and Matterhorn high lands is Lake Basin, in which the Lostine River, West Fork Wallowa River, and Hurricane Creek originate among many small lakes. To the north and east of Sacajawea Peak and Chief Joseph Mountain the Wallowa Mountains come to an end at Wallowa Lake, just south of the town of Joseph. A road runs south from Joseph along the east side of Wallowa Lake and into the valley of the Wallowa River. A number of recreation opportunities are located there, south of Wallowa Lake, including Wallowa Lake State Park and the Wallowa Lake Tramway on Mount Howard.

History
Sacajawea Peak is named for Sacagawea, the Shoshone woman who traveled with the Lewis and Clark Expedition. A proposal to change the name Sacajawea Peak to Sacagawea Peak was submitted in February 1998. In December 1999, the proposal was rejected by the United States Board on Geographic Names.

See also

 List of Ultras of the United States

Gallery

References

External links

 

Mountains of Oregon
Landforms of Wallowa County, Oregon
Wallowa–Whitman National Forest
Sacagawea